Gualaquiza is a town in the Morona Santiago province of Ecuador. It is the seat of the Gualaquiza Canton.

Sources 
World-Gazetteer.com
https://web.archive.org/web/20110722011621/http://www.volunteeringecuador.info/morona-santiago/gualaquiza.html

Populated places in Morona-Santiago Province